Anna Magnusson (born 31 March 1995) is a Swedish female biathlete. She represented Sweden at the 2014 and 2015 junior world championships and at the 2015 World Championships in Kontiolahti.

Together with Linn Persson, Elvira Öberg, and Hanna Öberg, she won her first World Cup competition victory on 11 December 2021 in Hochfilzen. On 16 December 2022, she took her first individual World Cup competition podium place when winning a World Cup sprint competition in Le Grand-Bornand.

Biathlon results
All results are sourced from the International Biathlon Union.

Olympic Games
1 medal (1 silver)

World Championships
1 medal (1 silver)

*During Olympic seasons competitions are only held for those events not included in the Olympic program.
**The single mixed relay was added as an event in 2019.

World Cup

References

External links

1995 births
Swedish female biathletes
Olympic biathletes of Sweden
Biathletes at the 2018 Winter Olympics
Biathletes at the 2022 Winter Olympics
Medalists at the 2018 Winter Olympics
Olympic medalists in biathlon
Olympic silver medalists for Sweden
People from Piteå
Living people
Biathlon World Championships medalists